The Minister of Forestry is a ministerial portfolio in the government of New Zealand. The position was created in 1893 as Commissioner of Forests, being renamed Commissioner of State Forests in 1922 before finally having the title altered from Commissioner to Minister in 1949.

The present Minister is Stuart Nash.

List of Ministers
The following ministers held the office of Minister of Forestry.

Key

See also
Minister for Primary Industries

Notes

References

External links
 Ministry of Agriculture and Forestry

Agriculture in New Zealand
Forestry